Storr is a surname of Old Scandinavian origin, and may refer to

 Anthony Storr (1920–2001), English psychiatrist and author
 Catherine Storr (1913–2001), English novelist and children's writer
 Farrah Storr (born 1978), British journalist
 Glen Milton Storr (1921–1990), Australian biologist
 Gottlieb Conrad Christian Storr (1749–1821), German physician and naturalist
 Jamie Storr (born 1975), Canadian ice hockey player
 Paul Storr (1771–1844), London silversmith
 Robert Storr (art academic), American  curator, critic and painter

See also

 The Storr
 Storrs (disambiguation)